Gloridonus is a genus of leafhoppers in the family Cicadellidae. There are more than 80 described species in Gloridonus.

There are four subgenera in Gloridonus, the largest of which is the former genus Ballana, which was incorporated into Gloridonus in 2014.

Species
These species belong to the genus Gloridonus:

 Gloridonus abruptus DeLong, 1964
 Gloridonus adversus DeLong, 1937
 Gloridonus ajo Hamilton, 2014
 Gloridonus amplectus DeLong, 1935
 Gloridonus angulus DeLong, 1937
 Gloridonus aptus DeLong, 1964
 Gloridonus arcuatus DeLong, 1964
 Gloridonus arma DeLong, 1937
 Gloridonus atelus DeLong, 1964
 Gloridonus atridorsum Van Duzee, 1894
 Gloridonus baja Hamilton, 2014
 Gloridonus basala DeLong, 1964
 Gloridonus bifidus DeLong, 1937
 Gloridonus calceus DeLong, 1937
 Gloridonus caliperus DeLong, 1937
 Gloridonus callidus DeLong, 1937
 Gloridonus chiragricus Ball, 1900
 Gloridonus chrysothamnus DeLong & Davidson, 1934
 Gloridonus convergens DeLong, 1964
 Gloridonus cuna DeLong, 1937
 Gloridonus curtus DeLong, 1964
 Gloridonus curvatus DeLong, 1964
 Gloridonus delea DeLong, 1937
 Gloridonus dena DeLong, 1937
 Gloridonus densus DeLong, 1964
 Gloridonus directus DeLong, 1964
 Gloridonus dissimilatus Ball, 1910
 Gloridonus diutius DeLong, 1937
 Gloridonus dolus DeLong, 1964
 Gloridonus eburatus Hamilton, 2014
 Gloridonus effusus DeLong, 1964
 Gloridonus elexa DeLong, 1937
 Gloridonus extremus DeLong, 1964
 Gloridonus filamenta DeLong, 1937
 Gloridonus flexus DeLong, 1964
 Gloridonus forfex Hamilton, 2014
 Gloridonus gemellus Ball, 1910
 Gloridonus generosus Ball, 1910
 Gloridonus gerula Ball, 1910
 Gloridonus gloriosus Ball, 1910
 Gloridonus hamus DeLong, 1937
 Gloridonus hebeus DeLong, 1937
 Gloridonus indens DeLong, 1937
 Gloridonus ipis DeLong, 1964
 Gloridonus jacumba Hamilton, 2014
 Gloridonus knulli DeLong, 1964
 Gloridonus languidus Ball, 1902
 Gloridonus laterus DeLong, 1937
 Gloridonus latulus DeLong, 1937
 Gloridonus nigridens DeLong, 1937
 Gloridonus occidentalis DeLong, 1937
 Gloridonus ornatus DeLong, 1964
 Gloridonus orthus DeLong, 1937
 Gloridonus plenus DeLong, 1937
 Gloridonus polica DeLong, 1937
 Gloridonus projectus DeLong, 1964
 Gloridonus pulcher Hamilton, 2014
 Gloridonus quintini Hamilton, 2014
 Gloridonus radiatus DeLong, 1964
 Gloridonus recurvatus DeLong, 1937
 Gloridonus secus DeLong, 1937
 Gloridonus spatulatus Ball, 1936
 Gloridonus spinosus DeLong, 1937
 Gloridonus titusi Ball, 1910
 Gloridonus traversus DeLong, 1964
 Gloridonus tremulus DeLong, 1964
 Gloridonus undatus DeLong, 1964
 Gloridonus ursinus Ball, 1910
 Gloridonus vapidus Ball, 1910
 Gloridonus vastulus Ball, 1910
 Gloridonus velosus DeLong, 1937
 Gloridonus venditarius Ball, 1910
 Gloridonus verutus Van Duzee, 1925
 Gloridonus vescus Ball, 1910
 Gloridonus vespertinus Ball, 1910
 Gloridonus vetulus Ball, 1910
 Gloridonus viriosus Ball, 1910
 Gloridonus visalia Ball, 1910
 Gloridonus vivatus Ball, 1910
 Gloridonus xerophilus Hamilton, 2014
 Gloridonus xyston Hamilton, 2014
 Gloridonus yolo Hamilton, 2014

References

Further reading

 

Cicadellidae
Hemiptera genera